Fidelity Bank may refer to the following commercial banks:

 Fidelity Bank Ghana
 Fidelity Bank Nigeria
 FidelityBank, full name Fidelity Commercial Bank Limited, Kenya

See also
 First Fidelity Bank, Oklahoma City
 Fidelity Investments, a financial services firm based in Boston, Massachusetts
 Fidelity Trust Company, a former bank in Philadelphia, Pennsylvania